Forgotten Fishheads Vol. 13 is the first compilation album released by The Great Luke Ski in 2000, containing rare tracks and three new tracks.  This album and the similarly titled Forgotten Fishheads Vol. 27 were originally given out to members of Luke's fan club, but have since become releases on their own accord.

Track listing
"Use The Force" - 4:15
"Everyone's Free To Earn Profit" - 5:17
"Rudolph the Red Nosed Reindeer" - 2:57
1998-99 Badger High School Jazz Ensemble, featuring Michael Sienkowski
"This is Luke Ski's PSYCHO Potpourri!" - 0:44
"Immature Amateur Adolescent Animator" - 3:17
'86 Cody Cabin Song" - 0:42
"Weird Guys Rap" - 3:35
"To All Da Girls I've Loved Beefor" - 3:29
"Things That Make You Go Rar!" - 1:13
"You Down With Gnome? Hee Hee!" - 4:06
"Gnome on the Range" - 4:49
"Duke of Earl" - 3:10
"My Life Til Now" - 3:37
"Humpa Hound (Buttmunch Remix)" - 3:53
"And Now It's Time For Raymond P. Whalen" - 0:24
"Taco Bell" - 1:21
Contains in-jokes from "Ray TV", a show produced by Luke and his friends
"I'm De Man!" - 2:18
By The Mannequin Boys
"The Michael McGee Song" - 1:28
By Frozen Scream
"The Whistling Song" - 1:50
By Vomit Face
"Proctologist Man" - 2:25
By Frozen Scream
"Gimmie A Break" - 0:27
"Gimmie A Break (Slim Jim Remix)" - 0:21
"K.B. Bongs R Us" - 0:55
"NRA Freedom Answering Machine" - 0:41
"My Momma Don't Wear No Socks" - 5:12
By Kansas City ComedySportz '94

References

2000 compilation albums
Luke Ski albums